Route 62 is a major north–south arterial route in Winnipeg, Manitoba that has eight different street names.

The route serves both the North End and St. Vital areas of Winnipeg, and forms the westernmost boundary of the downtown core. Osborne Street, between the Assiniboine and Red Rivers, is a major shopping district, especially in the area between Roslyn Road and Corydon Avenue, known as Osborne Village.

Route description 
The official route begins on Salter Street in the city's suburb of West Kildonan; its northernmost point is often given on maps as the intersection of Salter Street and Southall Drive.

It remains as Osborne Street North as it passes by the Manitoba Legislative Building, and then as Osborne Street as it crosses over the Assiniboine River at the Osborne Bridge, through Confusion Corner and into Fort Rouge. The route's name changes to Dunkirk Drive when it enters the suburb of St. Vital at the St. Vital Bridge over the Red River, and again to Dakota Street when it crosses St. Mary's Road just north of St. Vital Centre. The route ends at the intersection of Dakota Street and Aldgate Road in the Dakota Crossing neighbourhood of south St. Vital.

Major intersections
From north to south:

References

062
St. Vital, Winnipeg
Downtown Winnipeg
Fort Rouge, Winnipeg
North End, Winnipeg